Zdeněk Moravec (born 1968) is a Czech astronomer and astrophysicist.

Zdeněk Moravec is a graduate from Charles University in Prague. He became a prolific discoverer of minor planets, during his stay at the Kleť Observatory in South Bohemia, Czech Republic, from 1992 to 2000. He is credited by the Minor Planet Center with a total of 93 discovered bodies (between 1994 and 1998), of which 65 were co-discoveries together with astronomer Miloš Tichý. In March 2008 they discovered the minor planet 17805 Švestka at the Kleť Observatory, which they named it in honor of solar physicist Zdeněk Švestka.

Since 2001, he teaches theoretic physics and computer modelling at Jan Evangelista Purkyně University in Ústí nad Labem, Czech Republic.

List of discovered minor planets

See also 
 9991 Anežka
 15374 Teta
 43954 Chýnov
 :Category:Discoveries by Zdeněk Moravec

References

External links 
 RNDr. Zdeněk Moravec, Ph.D., Jan Evangelista Purkyně University

1968 births
20th-century astronomers
Czech astronomers
Discoverers of asteroids

Living people
Charles University alumni